The University of Central Florida College of Health Professions and Sciences was formed in 2018. Formerly, many of the college's programs were housed in the former College of Health and Public Affairs of the University of Central Florida located in Orlando, Florida, United States. The current dean of the college is 	Christopher Ingersoll. The college of Health and Public Affairs ceased to exist in 2018; its programs were restructured in the current College of Health Professions and Sciences, and by the College of Community Innovation and Education.

The college offers 23 degree options, including 2 doctoral degree programs, and 6 certificate options.

Organization
The College of Health Professions and Sciences includes four departments and schools: ref:https://healthprofessions.ucf.edu/departments/ 
 School of Communication Sciences and Disorders
 School of Social Work
 School of Kinesiology and Physical Therapy
 Department of Health Sciences

Degrees, Minors & Certificates
The College of Health Professions and Sciences currently offers undergraduate and graduate programs at UCF’s Orlando campus. Several programs are available online as well. From the molecular level to the community level, there’s a program of study for you.

Bachelor's Degrees:
 Communication Sciences and Disorders B.A.	
 Communication Sciences and Disorders B.S.	
 Health Sciences B.S. - Health Promotion Track	
 Health Sciences B.S. - Pre-Clinical Track
 Kinesiology B.S. - Exercise and Sport Physiology Track
 Kinesiology B.S. - Sport and Athletic Coaching Track
 Social Work BSW

Master's Degrees:
 Athletic Training MAT (New in summer 2019)	
 Communication Sciences and Disorders M.A.
 Social Work MSW (Online options available)
 Kinesiology M.S.

Doctoral Degrees:
 Exercise Physiology Track, Education Ph.D.	
 Physical Therapy DPT	
 Social Work Track, Public Affairs Ph.D.

Minors:
 Aging Studies (Available completely online)	
 Communication Sciences and Disorders	
 Fitness Training
 Health Sciences
 Sport and Athletic Coaching

Undergraduate Certificates
 Aging Studies (Available completely online)	
 Children's Services	
 Language Development and Disorders
	
Graduate Certificates
 Anatomical Sciences
 Military Social Work

References

External links
University of Central Florida
UCF College of Health Professions and Sciences
CHPS Organizational Chart
CHPS Strategic Plan
CHPS Annual Report

Health and Public Affairs
Educational institutions established in 1978
1978 establishments in Florida